Sarnówko may refer to the following places:
Sarnówko, Kuyavian-Pomeranian Voivodeship (north-central Poland)
Sarnówko, Gmina Kartuzy in Pomeranian Voivodeship (north Poland)
Sarnówko, Gmina Somonino in Pomeranian Voivodeship (north Poland)